Altınekin is a town and district of Konya Province in the Central Anatolia region of Turkey. According to 2000 census, population of the district is 23,062 of which 9,145 live in the town of Altınekin.

Notes

References

External links
 District governor's official website 
 District municipality's official website 

Towns in Turkey
Populated places in Konya Province
Districts of Konya Province
Lycaonia